John C. Rothwell (born 1954) is a Professor of neurophysiology at the UCL Institute of Neurology. His main area of interest is transcranial magnetic stimulation and motor control.

Education
Rothwell was educated at the University of Cambridge. He completed his PhD at King's College London in 1980 which supervised by David Marsden.

Career and research
His group has pioneered the use of the paired-pulse technique (Kujirai et al. 1992), interhemispheric studies (Ferbert et al. 1992).

Rothwell was appointed head of the Medical Research Council (MRC) Human Movement and Balance Unit after the untimely death of David Marsden. He has written over 400 papers and numerous chapters.

References

British physiologists
Science teachers
Academics of the University of Cambridge
Living people
1954 births